No. 1312 Flight Royal Air Force, commonly abbreviated to 1312 Flt RAF, is an independent flight of the Royal Air Force (RAF).  Currently based at RAF Station Mount Pleasant (more commonly known as RAF Mount Pleasant, and also known as Mount Pleasant Complex) in East Falkland, 1312 Flt are supporting at present the defence of the Falkland Islands and other nearby British Overseas Territories.

The Royal Air Force contribution to British Forces South Atlantic Islands is based at Mount Pleasant; the primary frontline component is No. 1435 Flight, with its four Eurofighter Typhoon FGR4 advanced multi-role combat aircraft. 1312 Flight provides aerial refuelling, air transport, search and rescue, and maritime patrol.  The latter is an important mission to the Falkland Islands government, as the Lockheed C-130K Hercules verifies that all fishing vessels are licensed; at £1,000 per licence per season - an important source of income. The flight motto is 'Uphold the Right'; the motto of the Falkland Islands is 'Desire the Right'.

No. 1312 Flight history
It originally operated six Avro Ansons to collect and deliver aircrew involved in the ferrying replacement aircraft to operational squadrons.

The original task was to  operate the Lockheed C-130K Hercules C1K on air-to-air refuelling missions, but this was later replaced by Vickers VC10 K4 (borrowed from 101 Squadron) and C-130K Hercules C1s from the Lyneham Wing. On 31 August 2013, the VC10 was replaced by a Lockheed TriStar K1 from 216 Squadron.

Presently, 1312 Flt utilise aircraft and crew from RAF Brize Norton.  Specifically, No. 70 Squadron provide an Airbus A400M Atlas C1, whilst No. 10 and 101 Squadron provide an Airbus Voyager KC2 or KC3.

Unit badge
Whilst it is common for RAF stations and RAF flying squadrons to be authorised to display an official heraldic badge following Royal approval, historically, it was extremely rare for RAF Flights to be granted authority for such. However, in recent times, the Royal Air Force has been more accommodating in granting Flights with their own unit badge such as the Battle of Britain Memorial Flight.

The quest for an official heraldic badge for 1312 Flight began sometime 2000.  No 1435 Flight's badge contained a Cassin's Falcon (a Peregrine falcon, common in the Falklands), so in keeping with the larger transport aircraft operated by 1312, a larger bird, the Upland Goose was chosen. 'Uphold the Right' was selected as the official motto, in keeping with other MPA units, and the Falkland Island's own motto, 'Desire the Right'.  The badge was eventually awarded August 2002, and received its Royal approval in 2003.

Aircraft operated

Flight bases

See also

No. 1453 Flight RAF
List of Royal Air Force aircraft squadrons
List of Royal Air Force independent flights

References
Notes

Bibliography

1312 Flight
Military units and formations established in 1944